(I) Don't Got a Place is a single by American post-hardcore band Girls Against Boys, released on August 29, 1994 by Touch and Go Records.

Track listing

Personnel 
Adapted from the (I) Don't Got a Place liner notes.
 Girls Against Boys
 Alexis Fleisig – drums
 Eli Janney – sampler, bass guitar, backing vocals
 Scott McCloud – lead vocals, guitar
 Johnny Temple – bass guitar
Production and additional personnel
 Ted Niceley – production

Release history

References

External links 
 

1994 singles
1994 songs
Girls Against Boys songs